Jorge Adolfo Carlos Livieres Banks (22 February 1929 – 17 December 2018) was a Paraguayan Roman Catholic bishop.

Biography 
Livieres Banks was born in Paraguay and was ordained to the priesthood in 1956. He served as titular bishop of Utimmira and as auxiliary bishop of the Roman Catholic Archdiocese of Asunción, Paraguay, from 1976 to 1987. He then served as bishop of the Territorial Prelature of Encaranación from 1987 to 1990 and as bishop of the Roman Catholic Diocese of Encarnación, Paraguay, from 1990 to 2003.

Notes

1929 births
2018 deaths
20th-century Roman Catholic bishops in Paraguay
21st-century Roman Catholic bishops in Paraguay
Roman Catholic bishops of Encarnación